Santiago Hezze (born 22 October 2001) is an Argentine professional footballer who plays as a midfielder for Huracán.

Club career
Hezze is a product of the Huracán youth system. He made the breakthrough into first-team football in 2019–20, initially as an unused substitute for a Copa Sudamericana three-goal loss away to Atlético Nacional on 5 February 2020. Hezze appeared for his senior debut just over a week later, as he played the full duration of a home loss to Aldosivi. Four appearances followed in his first season, including an eventual bow in the Sudamericana in the second leg against Atlético Nacional on 19 Februar; which saw him assist Leandro Grimi's goal in a 1–1 draw.

International career
In December 2019, Hezze received a call-up to train with the Argentina U23s.

Personal life
Hezze is the nephew of former footballer Antonio Mohamed; his father, Julio, worked with Mohamed at Monterrey.

Career statistics
.

Notes

References

External links

2001 births
Living people
Footballers from Buenos Aires
Argentine footballers
Association football midfielders
Club Atlético Huracán footballers